Pure Dynamite is an album by American saxophonist Buddy Terry recorded in 1972 and released on the Mainstream label.

Reception

The Allmusic site awarded the album 3 stars.

Track listing
All compositions by Buddy Terry except as indicated
 "Quiet Afternoon" (Stanley Clarke) - 10:09
 "Paranoia" - 10:45
 "Baba Hengates" (Mtume) - 17:07

Personnel
Buddy Terry - tenor saxophone, soprano saxophone, flute
Woody Shaw - trumpet
Eddie Henderson - trumpet, flugelhorn
Kenny Barron - piano
Joanne Brackeen - piano, electric piano
Stanley Clarke, Mchezaji - bass
Billy Hart, Lenny White - drums
Airto Moreira - percussion
Mtumé - African percussion

References

Mainstream Records albums
Buddy Terry albums
1972 albums
Albums produced by Bob Shad